Tri Peaks may refer to:

 Tri Peaks (game), a card game 
 Tri Peaks (Santa Monica Mountains), mountain in the Santa Monica Mountains

See also 
 Three Peaks (disambiguation)
 Trimountain (disambiguation)